Kari Erickson (born December 18, 1971 as Kari Liapis) is an American curler and Olympian.

Career 
Erickson started curling in 1988 and had a successful junior career, winning the Minnesota State Junior Championship five years in a row, 1989–1993. Three of those years she went on to win the United States Junior Championship (1990, 1992, 1993). Winning the US Championship allowed her to represent the United States at the World Junior Championships, at which she finished 5th, 2nd, and 3rd, respectively.

In 1994 Erickson made her first appearance at the United States Women's Championship, making it to the semifinals. After a few year gap she returned to the National Championship five more times in a six year span: 1997 (2nd), 1998 (1st), 1999, 2001 (1st), 2002 (2nd). As US Champion in 1998 and 2001 she represented the United States at the World Women's Championships, finishing 7th in 1998 and 5th in 2001.

She has twice competed at the US Olympic Trials, finishing third in 1998 and first in 2001. At the 2002 Winter Olympics in Salt Lake City the Erickson team had a 6–3 record at the end of the round robin. The United States team lost to Switzerland in the semifinals and Canada in the bronze medal match to finish 4th. Erickson's Olympic team included her sister Stacey Liapis at second and her dad Mike Liapis as coach.

Personal life 
Erickson is the sister of Stacey Liapis. She is married to Darren Erickson and has two children.

Teams

References

External links

1971 births
Living people
People from Bemidji, Minnesota
American female curlers
Olympic curlers of the United States
Curlers at the 2002 Winter Olympics
American curling champions
21st-century American women